The BRM P207 was a Formula One racing car, designed by Len Terry and constructed by British Racing Motors, which raced in the 1977 Formula One season. It was powered by a 3.0-litre V12 engine, with a claimed output of 488bhp. London-based Swiss watchmakers Rotary Watches provided sponsorship money. The car failed to score any points during the season. The team made a total of nine entries during the season, but only qualified in one instance, at the 1977 Brazilian Grand Prix. Driven by Larry Perkins, the car retired on lap one due to overheating. Its qualifying time was six seconds slower than that of the second-to-last starter. One British journalist in Brazil exclaimed that he was ashamed of being British. The car failed to appear at the season opening Argentine Grand Prix because it was too wide to fit in the hold of the aircraft that was going to transport it to South America.

The P207 was also BRM's last entry in the Formula One World Championship. In 1978, a second P207 was entered in the domestic Aurora F1 Championship with Teddy Pilette driving. He finished thirteenth in the series with one fourth- and one fifth-placed finish. Both P207s survive, and have appeared in historic racing.

The last Formula One BRM, was the P230 of 1979: intended for the Aurora series, it was never raced.

Complete Formula One World Championship results

(key)

References

BRM Formula One cars